The 1890 New York state election was held on November 4, 1890, to elect a judge of the New York Court of Appeals, as well as all members of the New York State Assembly.

History
In 1890, there was only one state officer to be elected statewide: a judge of the Court of Appeals, to succeed Robert Earl whose fourteen-year term would expire at the end of the year.

The Republican State Committee met on September 2 at the Fifth Avenue Hotel in New York City. The incumbent Democrat Robert Earl was nominated to succeed himself on the first ballot (vote: Earl 21, Daniel G. Rollins 3).

The Democratic State Committee met on September 23 at the Hoffman House in New York City. Edward Murphy Jr. was Chairman. The incumbent judge Robert Earl was re-nominated unanimously.

The Socialist Labor state convention met on September 25 at Clarendon House in New York City. Francis Gerau was nominated for the Court of Appeals.

Result
The jointly nominated incumbent Robert Earl was re-elected.

68 Democrats and 60 Republicans were elected for the session of 1891 to the New York State Assembly.  The New York State Senate consisted of 19 Republicans and 13 Democrats.

Notes

Sources
Result in New York City: THE VOTE IN THE COUNTY in NYT on November 21, 1890
Result in Kings County: BETTER LATE THAN NEVER in NYT on December 3, 1890
Result: The Tribune Almanac 1891

See also
New York state elections

1890
1890 New York (state) elections